Phongolo Nature Reserve is an Ezemvelo KZN Wildlife reserve in Maputaland, KwaZulu-Natal, South Africa. The reserve is 10,485 ha in extent.

The reserve is a co-operative conservation project between private landowners, tribal communities and government conservation services, and aims to form the heart of a large ecological and socio-economically viable "Big Five" reserve. It is home to an impressive collection of wildlife and vegetation. In addition to the two breeding herds of African elephant, there are also hyenas, buffalos, rhinos, leopards, zebras, wildebeests, giraffes, and impalas.

It was first proclaimed in 1894 by President Paul Kruger.

References

External links
 Ezemvelo KZN Wildlife
 White Elephant Lodge
 Shayamanzi Houseboat

Nature reserves in South Africa
Ezemvelo KZN Wildlife Parks